Valikhani is a village in Sar Firuzabad Rural District of Firuzabad District of Kermanshah County, Kermanshah Province, Iran. At the 2006 census, its population was 98, in 26 families.

References 

Populated places in Kermanshah County